Isaac Andrew Asiata (born December 29, 1992) is a former American football guard. He played college football at Utah.

College career 
Asiata was a four-year starter at Utah, played in 45 games. He was a two time All conference selection and winner of the Morris Trophy, given to the best lineman in the Pac-12 in 2016. After the end of his collegiate career, he played in the Senior Bowl.

Professional career

Miami Dolphins
Asiata was drafted by the Miami Dolphins in the fifth round, 164th overall, in the 2017 NFL Draft.

On September 1, 2018, Asiata was waived by the Dolphins and was signed to the practice squad the next day. He was promoted to the active roster on November 9, 2018.

On May 16, 2019, Asiata was waived/injured by the Dolphins and placed on injured reserve. He was released on June 6, 2019.

Buffalo Bills
On July 22, 2019, Asiata was signed by the Buffalo Bills.

On July 30, 2019, Asiata retired from the NFL.

Personal life 
Isaac served a mission for The Church of Jesus Christ of Latter-day Saints. He is the cousin of NFL running back Matt Asiata. On April 7, 2020 Isaac became a police officer for the city of Provo, Utah

References

External links
Utah Utes bio
Miami Dolphins bio

1992 births
Living people
American football offensive guards
American sportspeople of Samoan descent
Buffalo Bills players
Miami Dolphins players
People from Spanish Fork, Utah
Players of American football from Utah
Utah Utes football players
Latter Day Saints from Utah